HD 20782 b is an extrasolar planet located approximately 117 light-years away in the constellation of Fornax, orbiting the star HD 20782.

This planet orbits in the most eccentric orbit known (as of November 2012), with a semi-major axis of 1.36 AU, and eccentricity e=0.97+/-0.01. As a result, it also has one of the most extreme temperature swings.

See also
 HD 80606 b

References

External links
 

Fornax (constellation)
Exoplanets discovered in 2006
Giant planets
Exoplanets detected by radial velocity

de:HD 20782 b